Shahrak-e Ziveh (also Romanized as Shahrak-e Zīveh; also known as Zīvah) is a village in Margavar Rural District, Silvaneh District, Urmia County, West Azerbaijan Province, Iran. At the 2006 census, its population was 1,787, in 325 families.

References 

Populated places in Urmia County